Admiralty Football Club, also commonly known as Admiralty FC, is a football club which plays in the Division 2 of the Singapore Football League, the third tier of football in Singapore.

History
Admiralty FC started off in 1987 as a participant of the Sembawang Group League, a mini league organized by the Football Association of Singapore which involved amateur clubs based in the Sembawang area in the 1980s. During its time in the Sembawang Group League, Admiralty FC often played against Delhi Juniors, which was the original name of Woodlands Wellington before it changed its name to Wellington FC in 1998.

In 1988, Admiralty FC finished as one of the top two teams in the Island-Wide Leagues and was set to be promoted to the Division 2 of the Singapore Football League (SFL). Its promotion was challenged by Gillman FC who seek to nullify a match between Admiralty FC and Shelford United, which Admiralty FC won 5-0. FAS rejected the challenge and Admiralty FC was successfully promoted to the SFL.

With only two years of participation, Admiralty FC was made an official football club in 1989 to compete in the SFL and it played the majority of its home games at the Yio Chu Kang stadium.

Nasiruddin Sawardi and Fahmie Abdullah were two other ex-Singapore internationals who featured for Admiralty in the early nineties.

Admiralty FC came under the limelight in February 2012 when its management announced the appointment of former Woodlands Wellington team manager and Tampines Rovers Director of Operations R. Vengadasalam as their team manager. It also made waves in the local footballing fraternity when it announced that it was interested in joining the S.League in 2013.

Following the arrival of Venga, Admiralty swooped for veteran midfielder and ex-Singapore international Mohd Noor Ali to become the team's player-coach. In preparation for the 2012 NFL Division 2 season, Venga also orchestrated the moves for several well-known former S.League players such as like Azhar Baksin, Tan Sio Beng and Shariff Abdul Samat, as well as Jean-Charles Blanpin and Nordine Talhi from Etoile FC following the Stars' decision to pull out from the 2012 S.League.

On 30 June 2012, Admiralty FC were crowned champions of the NFL Division 2 2012 season when they beat Jollilads Arsenal FC by a 5–1 scoreline. The victory was also the 12th consecutive win for the Wolves, preserving an unbeaten run for the club since the start of the 2012 NFL Division 2 season.

Admiralty made history by becoming the first NFL club to qualify for the League Cup after beating Singapore Recreation Club in the League Cup Playoff Final on 12 May 2013.

2012 NFL Division 2 season

In a pre-season friendly, Admiralty beat S.League side Geylang United, a team that was playing its football 2 divisions above the Wolves, with a 2–1 scoreline, giving everyone a sense of things to come. Observers at the friendly match thought that Admiralty was in no way inferior to the Eagles.

Admiralty conquered the 2012 NFL Division 2 in great fashion, bulldozing their way across the league and embarking on a 12 match unbeaten run since the start of the season. They were crowned as NFL Division 2 champions on 30 June 2012 with 4 matches to spare.

During the S.League mid-season break, Tampines Rovers made an inquiry to Admiralty FC about the availability of tough tackling defender Shariff Abdul Samat. Upon hearing about the inquiry, Venga immediately released Shariff's Local Transfer Certificate, allowing the former 2007 S.League Young Player of the Year to make his return to the S.League.

This was also around the same time where Geylang United came knocking on Admiralty's doors asking for the services of player-coach Mohd Noor Ali. Noor Ali was allowed to leave for the club where he played for 6 seasons in the S.League, joining the Eagles as their assistant coach.

Following Noor Ali's departure, midfielder Azhar Baksin was installed as the new player-coach while defender Tan Sio Beng was appointed as the player-assistant coach. Both players were chosen due to their match experience in the S.League, as well as their valuable experience as ex-Singapore internationals.

After a dominant season in Division 2, R. Vengadasalam, the team manager of Admiralty FC submitted their application to join the 2013 S.League season in July 2012 but their bid was rejected. A FAS spokesman explained that this was because the S.League will remain a 13-team competition next season.

Rivalries
Admiralty FC has a huge rivalry with fellow NFL club Sembawang Sports Club, due to the fact that both teams have stemmed from the Sembawang area in northern Singapore. Both teams often locked horns in the NFL Division One in the nineties.

Notable players 

 Mohd Noor Ali
 Azhar Baksin
 Tan Sio Beng
 Shariff Abdul Samat
 Jean-Charles Blanpin
 Nordine Talhi

Honours
National Football League
Division 1 Champions: 2006 & 2007
Division 2 Champions: 2012

References

Football clubs in Singapore